Uhei Kaclakin (Uhei Kachlakan, Uhei Kahlakim) may be either of two neighboring languages,
Liana language
Benggoi language